The 2014 Vuelta Internacional Femenina a Costa Rica was a stage race held in Costa Rica, with a UCI rating of 2.2. It was the third stage race of the 2014 Women's Elite cycling calendar.

Stages

Stage 1
26 February 2014 – Guápiles to  San Miguel de Sarapiquí,

Stage 2
27 February 2014 – San Gerardo Ticabán to San Rafael La Colonia, individual time trial (ITT)

Stage 3
28 February 2014 – Orotina to Parrita,

Stage 4
1 March 2014 – Heredia to Grecia,

Stage 5
2 March 2014 – San José to San José,

Jerseys
 denotes the leader of the General classification; the rider who has the lowest accumulated time.

Classification leadership table

References

Vuelta Internacional Femenina a Costa Rica
Vuelta Internacional Femenina a Costa Rica
Women's road bicycle races
International sports competitions hosted by Costa Rica
Cycling in Costa Rica